Dušan Houdek (born 2 April 1931) is a Czech former sports shooter. He competed in the 50 metre rifle, three positions and 50 metre rifle, prone events at the 1960 Summer Olympics.

References

1931 births
Living people
Czech male sport shooters
Olympic shooters of Czechoslovakia
Shooters at the 1960 Summer Olympics
Sportspeople from Bratislava